CSR is a South Korean girl group formed and managed by A2Z Entertainment. The septet—consisting of members Sua, Geumhee, Sihyeon, Seoyeon, Yuna, Duna and Yeham—was at the time of debut composed entirely of 17-year-olds, a first time in the industry. They made their official debut on July 27, 2022, with the release of their first extended play (EP) Sequence: 7272.

Name 
CSR is an abbreviation of Cheotsarang (lit. First Love). The company stated on the name that, "taking advantage of all members being seventeen years old, the group plans to show various interpretations of first love and tell the story of the members growing up year by year".

History

2022–present: Introduction, debut with Sequence: 7272 and Sequence: 17& 
On July 11, 2022, A2Z Entertainment announced that they would be debuting their first girl group. The members were revealed through trailers on July 11 and July 12. On July 12, 2022, the group's management company announced that the septet would be releasing their debut extended play Sequence: 7272 on July 28. The music video for their debut lead single "Pop? Pop!" was released one day prior to the release, and the press showcase was also held at Mastercard Hall in Yongsan-gu, Seoul on the afternoon of the 27th and the album was officially released on July 28. The group made their broadcast debut on Mnet's M Countdown on July 28 to perform "Pop? Pop!".

On November 17, the group released their first single album titled Sequence: 17& and its lead single "♡Ticon" (pronounced "love-ticon"). With this release, CSR earned their first music show win on KBS's Music Bank on December 2, 2022.

Members 
 Geumhee
 Sihyeon
 Seoyeon
 Yuna
 Duna
 Sua – leader
 Yeham

Discography

Extended plays

Single albums

Singles

Videography

Music videos

References 

2022 establishments in South Korea
K-pop music groups
Musical groups established in 2022
South Korean girl groups
Musical groups from Seoul
South Korean dance music groups
South Korean pop music groups